Peace Pilgrim (July 18, 1908 – July 7, 1981), born Mildred Lisette Norman, was an American spiritual teacher, mystic, pacifist, vegetarian activist and peace activist. In 1952, she became the first woman to walk the entire length of the Appalachian Trail in one season. Starting on January 1, 1953, in Pasadena, California, she adopted the name "Peace Pilgrim" and walked across the United States for 28 years, speaking with others about peace. She was on her seventh cross-country journey when she died.

A transcript of a 1964 conversation with Peace Pilgrim from a broadcast on KPFK radio in Los Angeles was published as "Steps Toward Inner Peace".

Early life 
Mildred Lisette Norman was born on a poultry farm in Egg Harbor City, New Jersey, in 1908, the oldest of three children. Her mother, Josephine Marie Ranch, was a tailor, and her father, Ernest Norman, a carpenter. Although poor, the Norman family was admired in a community of German immigrants, whose relatives originally settled the area after escaping Germany in 1855.

In 1933 she eloped with Stanley Ryder and moved to Philadelphia in 1939. They divorced in 1946. She became a vegetarian for ethical reasons, stating that as she could not kill any living creature. She believed that meat eating was poisonous to the body and lived on a diet of fruits, nuts, vegetables, wholegrains and dairy products.

Pilgrimage 

In the book, "Peace Pilgrim: Her Life and Work in Her Own Words," she related that her physical journey began after having experienced a "spiritual awakening," following a long period of meditation practice. She said that this awakening was a direct, mystical experience of the "creator's" love. She claimed that this spurred her to then start her decades-long walking journey for peace.

Her pilgrimage spanned almost three decades beginning January 1, 1953, in Pasadena, California. The Korean War was in progress. She continued walking for 28 years, spanning the American involvement in the Vietnam War and beyond. Peace Pilgrim was a frequent speaker at churches, universities, and local and national radio and television.

Expressing her ideas about peace, she referred to herself only as "Peace Pilgrim."
Peace Pilgrim's only possessions were the clothes on her back and the few items she carried in the pockets of her blue tunic which read "Peace Pilgrim" on the front and "25,000 miles on foot for peace" on the back. She had no organizational backing, carried no money, and would not even ask for food or shelter. When she began her pilgrimage she had taken a vow to "remain a wanderer until mankind has learned the way of peace, walking until given shelter and fasting until given food."

On July 7, 1981, while being driven to a speaking engagement near Knox, Indiana, Peace Pilgrim was killed in an automobile accident. A marker is in the front lawn on the west side of the highway.

At the time of her death, she was crossing the United States for the seventh time. After her death, her body was cremated, and her ashes were interred in a family plot near Egg Harbor City, New Jersey.

Legacy 
Friends of Peace Pilgrim is an all-volunteer non-profit organization dedicated to making information about the life and message of Peace Pilgrim available freely to all who ask. Since 1983 they have published and distributed over 400,000 copies of the book, Peace Pilgrim: Her Life and Work in Her Own Words, and over 1.5 million copies of the booklet, Steps Toward Inner Peace.  Books and booklets have been sent to over 100 countries. The book has been translated into 12 languages and the booklet into over 20 languages.

In 2005 Peace Pilgrim Park was created in her hometown of Egg Harbor City, New Jersey on part of the site of the former Neutral Water Health Resort Sanitarium. Since 2007 an annual Peace Pilgrim Celebration has been observed in the park and at sites throughout Egg Harbor City on September 20–22.

In 2017 she was inducted into the New Jersey Hall of Fame. The same year, she was inducted into the Appalachian Trail Hall of Fame.

Awards 
Peace Abbey Courage of Conscience Award
Inducted into the New Jersey Hall of Fame (2017)
Appalachian Trail Hall of Fame (2017)

Bibliography 
 Steps Toward Inner Peace (1964)
 Peace Pilgrim, Her Life and Work in her Own Words (1983)
 Peace Pilgrim: The Spirit of Peace (1997)
 Peace Pilgrim: An American Sage Who Walked Her Talk (2000)

See also 
 Granny D
 List of peace activists
 List of people who have walked across the United States
 Ronald Podrow

Notes

References 

.
.
.
.

External links 

Peace Pilgrim website – California
Peace Pilgrim Website 100th Anniversary- Birthplace, Egg Harbor City, NJ 

1908 births
1981 deaths
Activists from New Jersey
American pacifists
American spiritual teachers
American vegetarianism activists
Ascetics
Nonviolence advocates
People from Egg Harbor City, New Jersey
Road incident deaths in Indiana
Simple living advocates
Walking
Writers from New Jersey